Ballancourt-sur-Essonne (literally Ballancourt on Essonne) is a commune in the Essonne department in Île-de-France in northern France.

Geography
The Essonne forms the commune western border.
Ballancourt-sur-Essonne is 37 kilometers south east of Paris-Notre-Dame, point zero from road of France, 13 kilometers south west of Évry, 5 kilometers north east of La Ferté-Alais, 12 kilometers south west of Corbeil-Essonnes, 12 kilometers south east of Arpajon, 15 kilometers south east of Montlhéry, 15 kilometers north west of Milly-la-Forêt, 20 kilometers north east of Étampes, 23 kilometers south east of Palaiseau, 27 kilometers east of Dourdan.

Population
Inhabitants of Ballancourt-sur-Essonne are known as Ballancourtois in French.

Architectural heritage
The 17th century Château du Saussay and its park were awarded historical monument on January 19, 1951.
Father of the music rocks(Roches du père la Musique)
Chapel Saint-Blaise
Saint-Martin's church
Maison et parc sauvage de Madame Chaumerdiac situés au 12, rue Pasteur

See also
Communes of the Essonne department

References

External links

Official website 

Mayors of Essonne Association 

Communes of Essonne